Tayuan Lu Station is a station of Line 1, Suzhou Rail Transit. The station is located in Suzhou New District of Suzhou. It has been in use since April 28, 2012, the same time of the operation of Line 1.

Station

Accessible Information
 Tayuan Lu Station is a fully accessible station, this station equipped with wheelchair accessible elevators, blind paths with bumps, and wheelchair ramps. These facilities can help people with disabilities, seniors, youths, and pregnancies travel through Suzhou Rail Transit system.

Station configurations
L1 (First Floor/Street Level): Entrances/Exits (stairs and escalators); and elevators with wheelchair accessible ramps.

B1 (Mezzanine/Station Hall Level): Station Control Room; Customer Service; Automatic Ticket Vending Machines; Automatic Fee Collection Systems with turnstiles; stairs and escalators; and elevators with wheelchair accessible ramps.

B2 (Platform Level): Platform; toilet; stairs and escalators; elevators with wheelchair accessible ramps.

Station layout

Exits
Exit 1: South-West corner of Dengwei Lu and Tayuan Lu

Exit 2: South-East corner of Dengwei Lu and Tayuan Lu

Exit 3: North -East corner of Dengwei Lu and Tayuan Lu

Exit 4: North-West corner of Dengwei Lu and Tayuan Lu

First & last trains

Local attractions
TaoYuan Resort Hotel
GeLin Garden
BinHe Garden
MeiZhiYuan Garden
Eton International School
Technology University of Suzhou

Bus connections
Bus Stop: ZhangCheng Qiao - Connection Bus Routes: 325

Bus Stop: TaoYuan DuJiaCun - Connection Bus Routes: 40, 406, 313

Bus Stop: BinHe HuaYuan - Connection Bus Routes: 40, 406, 324, 353, 443

References

Railway stations in Jiangsu
Suzhou Rail Transit stations
Railway stations in China opened in 2012